Edechewe (the Fisher-Man) is a folk hero of the Madesi, a Native American tribe of the Pit River region, located in what is now Northern California. Edechewe was born supernaturally from the cone of a sugar pine as the result of a magical rite performed by his father, Ahsoballache. His parents nurture him through infancy, after which his grandmother, To'kis, raises him.

In toddlerhood, Edechewe begins to exhibit extraordinary hunting skills. He grows into an attractive, kindhearted young man. In appearance, character, and ability, he is an exemplar of Madesi manhood.

Under the guidance of the superbeing Annikadel, his adventures culminate in the completion of a mission to propel the Chools (personifications of the sun and moon) into the sky, along with their followers, the North Star and the South Star.

See also
 Achomawi
 Traditional narratives (Native California)

References

Native American mythology of California
Traditional narratives (Native California)